Armando José Nieves Vargas (born 14 November 1989) is a Colombian footballer who plays as a defender for Football Superleague of Kosovo side KF Liria.

References

External links

 

1989 births
Living people
Association football defenders
Colombian footballers
Categoría Primera A players
Categoría Primera B players
Atlético Junior footballers
C.D. Veracruz footballers
Barranquilla F.C. footballers
América de Cali footballers
Piast Gliwice players
Leones Negros UdeG footballers
Colombian expatriate footballers
Expatriate footballers in Mexico
Expatriate footballers in Poland
Footballers from Barranquilla
21st-century Colombian people